Bardesareh Rural District is a rural district (dehestan) in Oshtorinan District, Borujerd County, Lorestan Province, Iran. At the 2006 census, its population was 7,530, in 1,799 families.  The rural district has 13 villages.

References 

Rural Districts of Lorestan Province
Borujerd County